In Irish martial arts,  (meaning 'stick-fighting') (also called boiscín and ag imirt na maidí ) now refers to the various forms of stick-fighting from Ireland. Although an old term it was found by author John W. Hurley and introduced back into modern usage in the late 1990’s. Bataireacht literally means “fighting with sticks” and has no specifically  “Irish” connotation at all, but Hurley thought it a convenient word to use for non-Irish speakers since it is indeed Irish and does connote fighting, or fencing, with 3 foot sticks.

Definition
Bataireacht is a category of stick-fighting martial arts of Ireland.  The concept of people swinging sticks at each other, in anger, dates far into pre-history. It is likely to have started with the hominids that existed before homo sapiens. Neanderthals are known to have crafted heavy sticks into tools that were multi-purpose and resembled many modern Batas. Although stick-fighting is pre-historic, the vocabulary of Bataireacht can be traced back to Old Irish, one of the oldest languages in Europe. Wooden sticks & clubs were very significant in Bronze age warfare. The Bronze Age battlefield of Tollense, in Northern Germany contained Batas made from Ash and Sloe (which is a shrub related to Blackthorn). It is believed that peasant soldiers fought largely without metal as bronze was often preserved for the prestigious warrior class of horsemen. Certainly the archaeological records demonstrate large numbers of traumatic head injuries from the Bronze age time and are different from the types of injuries inflicted in the later Classical times or the Medieval age.

Bata is the Irish term for any kind of stick. In stick fighting, the actual bata or stick used for bataireacht is commonly called a shillelagh. There are a two ideas as to the origin of the word. The most popular and older one (in the English language) is that the name came from a genericization of the forest of Shillelagh, a barony situated in County Wicklow, and famous for its oak forests in the 18th century. As the oak coming from this region was in high demand, the term started to be applied to good quality sticks. This is the meaning that many British authors of the 18th and 19th centuries used when talking about shillelaghs, for example William Carleton who talked of cudgels made of "good shillelah" which had a leather thong attached. The first documentable use of the word “Shillelagh” in English, was in 1755, in Thomas Sheridan's The Brave Irishman the expression there is used side to side with "Andreaferrara", used by the protagonist to refer to his sword in the same manner as he refers to "Shillela", further relating the Irish fighting stick to broadsword fencing. Again, this explanation can be found in many different Ango-centric sources from the 18th and 19th centuries, and is therefore the most popular one in English. The other explanation is well documented in Irish language texts. For example, Gaelic scholar and native Irish speaker Patrick S. Dinneen in the 1927 edition of his Foclóir Gaedhilge agus Béarla dictionnary. notes that Sail Éille means "thonged cudgel", and explains that it was later anglicised as shillelagh. Dineen was actually born and raised at a time when stick-fencing was still actively practiced in his home area. The first use of the word “sail” for cudgel goes back thousands of years so other native Irish speaking linguists have repeatedly confirmed Dineen’s explanation for the origins of the word throughout the years. That definition has been dismissed only by Maxime Chouinard a French Canadian, who is noticeably not fluent in Irish and prefers the Anglo-centric explanation. 

Common woods used to make sticks included Blackthorn, oak, ash and hazel were traditionally the most common types of woods used to make shillelagh fighting sticks. 

The style is mostly characterized by the use of a cudgel, or knobbed stick, of different lengths but most often the size of a walking stick or small club. The stick is grabbed by the third of the handle end, the lower part protecting the elbow and allowing the user to maintain an offensive as well as defensive guard. This grip also allows launching fast punching-like strikes.

History
The Irish have used various sticks and cudgels as weapons of self-defence for centuries.  As with most vernacular martial arts, it is difficult to establish the origin of the art. The art certainly goes back to prehistory and possibly was widespread in the Bronze Age when metal was highly precious yet sticks were easily obtained. Weapons similar to shillelagh are described in various sources including heroic tales such as The Destruction of Da Derga's Hostel  and were also popular all over Europe  It would truly begin to catch the attention of writers in the 18th century. The shillelagh is still identified with Irish popular culture to this day, although the arts of bataireacht are much less so. The sticks used for bataireacht are not of a standardised size, as there are various styles of bataireacht, using various kinds of sticks.

The historical link between bataireacht and other Irish weapons is unclear. Some authors have argued that prior to the 19th century, the term had been used to refer to a form of stick-fencing used to train Irish soldiers in broadsword and sabre techniques.
This theory has been criticized, among other things for its lack of primary source material. Although fencing instruction and manuals existed at the time and were available in Ireland and abroad, with one of them illustrating bataireacht among wrestling, boxing and fencing   the two systems are in practice substantially different, namely in the active use of the buta, a part of the stick with no equivalent in European swords. Clues indicate that links may exist with other weapons closer in attributes such as the axe, but the historical descriptions are rare and limited in scope, so it is quite difficult to confirm. 
Others disagree as fighting with sticks while using broadsword techniques was common practice in Britain, France and Germany throughout the 18th and part of the 19th century. And we have period texts wherein the Broadsword fencing instructors themselves advise their students to use broadsword techniques with walking sticks, in civilian settings.   This of course does not apply to systems using a 4 foot stick such as those shown in Walkers manual. So it is puzzling why those same critics (those using a 4 foot stick) find the Irish broadsword stick-fencing style so threatening. It’s now a proven historical fact that 3 foot walking sticks were used almost exactly like the broadsword.

By the 18th century bataireacht became increasingly associated with Irish gangs called "factions". Irish faction fights involved large groups of men (and sometimes women) who engaged in melees at county fairs, weddings, funerals, or any other convenient gathering. Historians such as Carolyn Conley, believe that this reflected a culture of recreational violence. It is also argued that faction fighting had class and political overtones, as depicted for example in the works of William Carleton and James S. Donnelly, Jr.'s "Irish Peasants: Violence & Political Unrest, 1780".

By the early 19th century, these gangs had organised into larger regional federations, which coalesced from the old Whiteboys, into the Caravat and Shanavest factions. Beginning in Munster the Caravat and Shanavest "war" erupted sporadically throughout the 19th century and caused some serious disturbances.

As the faction fights became increasingly repressed by society and other sports such as hurling were promoted, bataireacht slowly faded in importance in Irish popular culture by the turn of the 20th century.
Although still documented sporadically, it has become mostly an underground practice saved by a few families who still handed down their own styles.

Modern practice
The modern practice of bataireacht has arisen amongst some practitioners from a desire to maintain or reinstate Irish family traditions, while for others a combination of historical and cultural interest has led to their interest.  Bataireacht has also gained popularity amongst non-Irish people, as a form of self-defence, as a cane or walking stick can be easily carried in modern society.

A few forms of bataireacht survive to this day, some of which are traditional styles specific to the family which carried them down through the years, like the rince an bhata uisce beatha ('dance [of] the whiskey stick') style of the Doyle family of Newfoundland, taught in Canada, Ireland, the United Kingdom, the United States and Germany, or Antrim Bata which is currently taught briefly in around five countries besides Ireland.

Additionally, members of the Western martial arts movement have "reconstructed" styles using period martial arts manuals, historical newspaper articles, magazines, pictorial evidence and court documents. Surviving instructional manuals which describe some use of the shillelagh include those by Rowland Allanson-Winn and Donald Walker.

See also

Angampora
Banshay
Bōjutsu
Gatka
Jogo do pau
Jūkendō
Kalaripayattu
Kendo
Kenjutsu
Krabi–krabong
Kuttu Varisai
Mardani khel
Silambam
Silambam Asia
Tahtib
Thang-ta
Varma kalai
World Silambam Association

References

Stick-fighting
European martial arts
Sports originating in Ireland